Manlio Hedair Badaró (April 23, 1933 – November 1, 2008) was a Brazilian-Portuguese actor and comedian.

Born in Brazil, Badaró moved to Portugal in 1957. He came over as part of the comedy group "Brasileira Fogo no Pandeiro." Once he restarted his career in Portugal he started to appear in several plays including "Empresta-me o teu apartamento" with actress Alina Vaz.

During an interview in May 2008 Badaró said "I have so many health problems that they have lost count: suffered a heart attack, a stroke, had a lymphoma and now I have discovered another cancer". Badaró died of stomach cancer on November 1, 2008.

Filmography

References

1933 births
2008 deaths
Brazilian male film actors
Brazilian male television actors
Brazilian male comedians
Brazilian emigrants to Portugal
Naturalised citizens of Portugal
Portuguese male film actors
Portuguese male television actors
Deaths from cancer in Portugal
Deaths from stomach cancer
20th-century comedians
Portuguese male comedians